Johan Levi Jern (22 September 1893, Korsholm - 22 May 1973) was a Finnish farmer and politician. He was a member of the Parliament of Finland from 1922 to 1954, representing the Swedish People's Party of Finland (SFP). During the Continuation War, he was one of the signatories of the "Petition of the Thirty-three", which was presented to President Ryti by members of the Peace opposition on 20 August 1943.

References

1893 births
1973 deaths
People from Korsholm
People from Vaasa Province (Grand Duchy of Finland)
Swedish-speaking Finns
Finnish Lutherans
Swedish People's Party of Finland politicians
Members of the Parliament of Finland (1922–24)
Members of the Parliament of Finland (1924–27)
Members of the Parliament of Finland (1927–29)
Members of the Parliament of Finland (1929–30)
Members of the Parliament of Finland (1930–33)
Members of the Parliament of Finland (1933–36)
Members of the Parliament of Finland (1936–39)
Members of the Parliament of Finland (1939–45)
Members of the Parliament of Finland (1945–48)
Members of the Parliament of Finland (1948–51)
Members of the Parliament of Finland (1951–54)
Finnish people of World War II
20th-century Lutherans